East Timor first competed at the Asian Games in 2002.

Asian Games

Medals by Asian Games 

Ranking are based on Total Overall Medal

Asian Para Games

Medals by Asian Para Games 

Ranking are based on Total Overall Medal

Southeast Asian Games

Medals by Southeast Asian Games 

Ranking are based on Total Overall Medal

Medals by Summer Sport

ASEAN Para Games

Medals by ASEAN Para Games 

Ranking are based on Total Overall Medal

References